Thomas Roosevelt Morris (1938 – November 6, 2010) was an American football and basketball coach. He served as the head football coach at Saint Paul's College in Lawrenceville, Virginia from 1966 to 1970, Virginia State University from 1977 to 1979, Fayetteville State University in 1980, and Morgan State University in 1981, compiling a career college football coach record of 33–54–5. Morris was also the head basketball coach at Saint Paul's from 1966 to 1971, tallying a mark of 44–66.

A native of Newport News, Virginia, Morris attended Collis P. Huntington High School there, graduating in 1957.  He played football and basketball at Saint Paul's before graduating in 1966.  Morris earned a master's degree in education from the College of William & Mary in 1971.  He left Saint Paul's the same year and moved to Morgan State as an assistant football coach.  He was promoted to defensive coordinator at Morgan State in 1973.  Morris was also an assistant football coach at Virginia Union University and Norfolk State University.

Head coaching record

Football

References

External links
 

1938 births
2010 deaths
Fayetteville State Broncos football coaches
Morgan State Bears football coaches
Norfolk State Spartans football coaches
Saint Paul's Tigers football coaches
Saint Paul's Tigers football players
Saint Paul's Tigers men's basketball coaches
Saint Paul's Tigers men's basketball players
Virginia State Trojans football coaches
Virginia Union Panthers football coaches
College of William & Mary alumni
Sportspeople from Newport News, Virginia
Players of American football from Virginia
Basketball players from Virginia
African-American coaches of American football
Basketball coaches from Virginia
African-American players of American football
African-American basketball coaches
African-American basketball players
20th-century African-American sportspeople